The following is a list of Sites of Special Scientific Interest in the Western Isles South Area of Search.  For Western Isles North see List of SSSIs in Western Isles North.  For SSSIs elsewhere in Scotland, see List of SSSIs by Area of Search.

 Allt Volagir
 Baleshare and Kirkibost
 Balranald Bog and Loch nam Feithean
 Berneray
 Boreray
 Bornish and Ormiclate Machairs
 Eoligarry
 Howmore Estuary, Lochs Roag and Fada
 Loch an Duin
 Loch Bee
 Loch Bee Machair
 Loch Druidibeg
 Loch Hallan
 Loch nam Madadh
 Loch Obisary
 Lochs at Clachan
 Machairs Robach and Newton
 Mingulay and Berneray
 Mointeach Scadabhaigh
 Monach Islands
 Obain Loch Euphoirt
 Pabbay
 Rockall
 Small Seal Islands
 St Kilda
 Vallay
 West Benbecula Lochs

 
Western Isles South